Sharon Anne Cook (born 1947) is a Canadian historian, currently the Emeritus Professor and Distinguished Professor of History at University of Ottawa, and also a published author.

Education
Cook received a B.A. (Hon.) from Carleton University in 1970; a B.Ed. from Queen's University in 1971; a M.A. from the Institute of Canadian Studies, Carleton University in 1987; and a Ph.D. in History from Carleton University in 1990.

Works

References

Academic staff of the University of Ottawa
Canadian women historians
Carleton University alumni
Queen's University at Kingston alumni
1947 births
Living people
21st-century Canadian women writers
21st-century Canadian historians